Lawrence Katz may refer to:
Lawrence C. Katz (1956–2005), neurobiologist
Lawrence F. Katz (born 1959), Harvard University economist